The women's 500 metre at the 2011 World Short Track Speed Skating Championships took place 12 March at the Sheffield Arena.

Results

Heats
Top two athletes from each heat and the next four fastest thirds qualified for heats.

Heat 1

Heat 3

Heat 5

Heat 2

Heat 4

Heat 6

Quarterfinals
Top two athletes from each heat qualified for semifinals.

Heat 1

Heat 3

Heat 2

Heat 4

Semifinals
Top two athletes from each heat qualified for final.

Heat 1

Heat 2

Final

References

2011 World Short Track Speed Skating Championships